Super Girl or Super Voice Girls (literally: "Super Female Voice", as it is homonym with "Super girl") was a Chinese singing contest for female contestants, organized by Hunan Satellite Television between 2004 and 2006. The show's official name was Mengniu Yoghurt Super Girl Contest until 2009; later it was known as BBK Music Phone Super Girl Contest, after the company that sponsored the series. It was generally described as the unofficial mainland Chinese version of the global television franchise Pop Idol (2001) and became one of the most popular entertainment shows in the country. Despite Super Girl'''s major popularity and success, the show was heavily criticised by Liu Zhongde, a member of the Chinese People's Political Consultative Conference. He essentially claimed Super Girl was poison for the youth.

The program was relaunched in 2009.  The Chinese title was changed to Happy Girls though the official English title remains unchanged as Super Girl. In 2011, the Chinese government banned Super Girl from airing, claiming the program to be too long. The State Administration of Radio, Film and Television (SARFT) told the Hunan station that Super Girl broke time rules for this kind of show. They should be no more than 90 minutes long, but episodes of Super Girl can last more than three hours. More than 2.5 billion people watched the show.

Huanan announced a third incarnation of the show on October 30, 2015. Auditions for the series closed on April 16, 2016.

Outline

Partly inspired by the many spinoffs of the UK show Pop Idol, the competition was open to any female contestant regardless of her origin, appearance, or how she sings. The almost unrestricted audition sessions drew contestants of ages ranging from 4 to 89 years old. The 2005 season attracted more than 120,000 applicants during the preliminary selection rounds, held in the five provinces of Hunan, Sichuan, Guangdong, Henan and Zhejiang. Many applicants travelled long distances to take part in the competition hoping to become a star. Each contestant was allowed 30 seconds to perform in front of judges and find out if they were selected for the preliminary regional rounds. To prevent another overwhelming audition season, a minimum age of eighteen was later set during the 2006 season.

Following the selection of contestants in the five regions, the competition began with the preliminary rounds. Preliminaries were held in each of the five locations where auditions were located. Television viewers were able to watch each of the preliminaries and vote for their favorite singers. Voting was conducted by telephone and text messaging.

The regional preliminaries were followed by a weekly broadcast knockout competition held in Changsha, Hunan province. Viewers called in to vote for their favourite singers, and the weakest two—as voted by the judges and the audience's weekly SMS— faced-off subsequently in a PK, short for Player Kill. The term is derived from kill-or-be-killed multiplayer online games. The singer with the fewest votes was then eliminated. Unlike Pop Idol, the last event was contested between the final three, rather than the final two contestants.

Unlike American Idol, judges for the competition were selected from different backgrounds in society, but they were all still Chinese. A few dozen "audience judges" were selected in addition to several professional judges.

History
The original version of the show was known as Super Boy, and aired in 2003 on Hunan Entertainment Channel, a local broadcaster based in Changsha, Hunan province in South Central China. The show was a success and its counterpart, Super Girl, aired at the beginning of 2004 with the slogan, "Sing as you want, sing out loud,"  and became the most viewed show in Hunan. However, the programme's impact was limited as the channel does not broadcast outside the province.

On May 6, 2004, Super Girl was introduced to a national audience by its producer Liao Ke through Hunan Satellite Television. In addition to broadcasting the original episodes created by Hunan Entertainment Channel, the network also developed this show in other 3 cities: Wuhan in Hubei province, Nanjing in Jiangsu province, and Chengduin Sichuan province. This show attracted an average of 10,000 contestants in each city and received nationwide attention.

Hunan Satellite Television introduced a second season of Super Girl on March 19, 2005. The preliminary rounds were filmed in five cities: Changsha in Hunan province, Guangzhou in Guangdong province, Zhengzhou in Henan province, Hangzhou in Zhejiang province, and Chengdu in Sichuan province. By the middle of the season, the competition captivated a nationwide audience and became one of the most watched television entertainment shows in mainland China with tens of millions of viewers.

Cultural impact

Positive impact
The final episode of the 2005 season was one of the most popular shows in Chinese broadcast history, drawing over 400 million viewers, more than the China Central Television New Year's Gala earlier that year. The final peaked at 280 million viewers at a given time, dwarfing the 12-million-viewer figure for the finals of Pop Idol. Despite the show being condemned by China Central Television as being "vulgar and manipulative", a third season of the show was launched and finished in early October 2006.

On January 18, 2006, China National Philatelic Corporation released a postage stamp issue featuring 2005 winner Li Yuchun. The set was released ahead of Li's 22nd birthday in her commemoration.

On May 11, 2009, The Oprah Winfrey Show, a worldwide famous television show, invited Zhang Liangying, who ranked 3rd overall in the 2005 contest, to make an American television singing debut. The subtitle of the show was "The World's Got Talent" and Zhang Liangying was the only East Asian singer in the show.

Some who were not chosen as winners have also been able to enter the recording industry through other means. Ji Minjia, who ranked 5th overall in the 2005 contest, worked in Los Angeles in 2006 to help with production of the title song for Japanese anime series The Galaxy Railways. On March 15, 2007, Japanese recording group Hello! Project announced Li Chun, one of the top 50 contestants in the 2006 Changsha regional, as one of two new members of Chinese ancestry of its pop group Morning Musume. Li Chun's photograph is the center photograph on the first row.

The contest has also inspired television producers to create other talent search shows, including ones based on American shows such as The Apprentice.

The show was the feature of a 2007 documentary titled "Super, Girls!", produced and directed by independent Chinese filmmaker Jian Yi during the 2006 contest season and released at the Cambridge Film Festival. An ARTiSIMPLE Studio production, "Super, Girls!" is the only independent feature-length documentary ever made about the "Super Girls."

Democratic expression
One of the main factors contributing to the show's popularity was that viewers are able to participate in the judging process by sending text messages with their mobile phones to vote for their favorite contestants. During the 2005 regional contest in Chengdu alone, 307,071 message votes were cast for the top three contestants, each vote costing 0.5 to 3 yuan. This was, according to Jim Yardley of International Herald Tribune, considered as one of the largest "democratic" voting exercises in mainland China.

Over 800 million text messages were sent during the third season of Super Girl, and fan clubs began to appear throughout the country.

While some culture and media experts praised Super Girl in blazing "a trail for cultural democracy" and breaking elitism in China's entertainment industry, others were quick in pointing out that the show represented a superficiality in society, "propelled by behind-the-scenes manipulation and state-of-the-art pomp and circumstance".

Criticism
Liu Zhongde of the Chinese People's Political Consultative Conference criticised both the show and its negative influence on society, saying the audience watches the program under a distorted mentality and in an unhealthy condition. He claimed that the government departments oversee culture and art, and they should not permit something like Super Girl to exist. He admitted it was the choice of the market while claiming it as low culture. He said it wasn't as bad as the 1983 Anti-Spiritual Pollution Campaign, but the elements are there: cultural invasion, suspicion of market forces, spiritual health, preservation of national culture, and allegations of popular entertainment spreading corruption among the youth, all facing off against a new concept of socialist morality.

In the end of 2011, China's State Administration of Radio, Film and Television (SARFT) has suspended the show from future production. While the official reason for such decision is the fact that the show exceeded its airing time throughout the season, many believe that the moral issue was behind this act. This claim is reinforced by Hunan TV news spokesman, Li Hao, who admitted the network will incorporate more 'positive' content in its 2012 programs.

Economic impact
Mengniu Milk Group reportedly paid ¥14 million to Hunan Television for rights to sponsor the show's broadcast outside Hunan province beginning with the 2005 season. According to one of China's leading thinktanks, the 2005 contest was estimated to have drawn in a total of ¥766 million (US$95.75 million). Indirect business impact of the competition was estimated at several billion yuan.

Television advertisement slots cost an average of ¥33,400 for 15 seconds in 2006, compared to the average of ¥28,000 in 2005. Advertising sales were expected to reach ¥200 million (US$25 million), nearly double that of the previous year.

Season summary

2004 season
The first season of Super Girl aired from May 6 to September 22, 2004. Although the winners of the competition were not promised recording contracts, the top three winners signed such deals.

Qualifications

Final contest
 Angela An Youqi (安又琪)
 Katy Wang Ti (王媞)
 Baby Zhang (Kristy Zhang Hanyun) (张含韵)
 Strings
 Jenne Sun Yibo

2005 season

The second season of Super Girl aired from March 19 to August 26, 2005. The announcement of Li Yuchun as the season's grand champion came under scrutiny as she had been leading voting results despite having the weakest voice among the top finalists. Despite the heavy criticism that arose during the competition season, the three 2005 finalists have been considered the most successful singers from the entire show.

Qualifications

Final contest (July 15 – August 26)

2006 season
The third season of Super Girl'' aired from April 2 to September 30, 2006. Shang Wenjie's selection as grand champion over Tan Weiwei, who is a professional vocalist from Sichuan Conservatory of Music, raised questions over each candidate's public appeal. Speculations arose that Shang, who appeared to be a copycat of Li Yuchun's image (somewhat androgynous), was voted grand champion due to the appeal of her Cinderella story.

Qualifications

Final contest

2009 season
E Media CEO Long Danni stated that through this competition, in addition to singers, the judges would also be looking for budding actresses and those that excel in other areas. Some of the Super Boys would also be co-hosts for the regional contests of Super Girls. The finale took place in August.

Regional contest
National Top 20 Qualifications
 Qualified
 Eliminated

Final Contest

 Champion
 ELLE cover girl
 Challenges succeed to switch rank
 Eliminated
 Retired

Overall Final contest total votes

2011 season

The 2011 season was won by Jeremy Duan Linxi from Yunnan. The runner-up was Cici Hong Chen.

See also
Hunan Satellite Television
Idol series
Super, Girls! - Chinese documentary film about girls trying out for the Super Girl contest
Super Boy - counterpart contest for male
The Voice of China - Chinese singing competition

References

External links

Hunan TV 2011 Super Girl official site
 Super Girl 2004 Influence Analysis 
Super Girl economics (2005 season)
Watch Online Super Girl All Seasons

Singing talent shows
Chinese music television series
Mandopop
2004 Chinese television series debuts
2011 Chinese television series endings
Chinese television shows
Mandarin-language television shows